Transport Nagar railway station is a planned railway station in the Sharda Nagar area of southern Lucknow. It lies on Lucknow–Kanpur highway. Northern Railway will develop a railway station here to decongest Charbagh railway station. Trains from Raebareli, Varanasi, Allahabad, Pratapgarh, Jaunpur, Zafrabad, Hardoi, Moradabad, Delhi, and Shahjahanpur will originate, terminate, and pass through this station. All trains from Varanasi can pass on to Moradabad – Delhi route without passing through Charbagh Station.

Connectivity

Transport Nagar railway station will be connected to rest of the city  with Transport Nagar metro station, which lies on north–south corridor. It will also be linked to city via local bus, auto services. One of the two main inter State bus terminals of the city i.e., Alambagh bus terminal is just 2 miles away.

Related railway projects

Transport Nagar Goods Yard 
NR is deciding to shift the Charbagh Goods Yard to Transport Nagar. This is so because railway has a lot of land in Transport Nagar area to develop a goods yard and a passenger terminal. This is also because the number of platforms needs to be increased in Charbagh station for which land is required.

Utrahtia–Zafrabad doubling 
The Utrahtia–Zafrabad rail track will undergo doubling so as to increase traffic and speed between Lucknow and Varanasi.

Utrahtia junction terminal 
If the passenger pressure continued to increase  NR will create a terminal railway station at Utrahtia to ease rail traffic at Charbagh station. It will be sixth major railway station in city.

References

External links
 http://indiarailinfo.com/station/map/utraitia-junction-utr/1114
 http://indiarailinfo.com/arrivals/transport-nagar-tpnr/9270

Railway stations in Lucknow